Mega Man is a comic series based on the video game series of the same name by Capcom produced by Archie Comics which was announced at New York Comic Con 2010.  The series began publication in April 2011 with Ian Flynn, who has written many stories for Archie's Sonic the Hedgehog series, as its lead writer. The series has proved highly successful, and in 2013 a crossover took place between the Mega Man and Sonic series, under the title "Worlds Collide". The series does not follow the events of the games in exact order, including an adaptation of the Japanese exclusive game Super Adventure Rockman between those of Mega Man 2 and Mega Man 3. The series later included a few stories set in the time of the Mega Man X series. The popularity of Worlds Collide subsequently led to a second crossover with the Sonic series, Worlds Unite. The series was put into an "indefinite hiatus" after issue 55, concluding with setup for an adaptation of Mega Man 4. 

The series is also notable for the artistic liberties taken with various characters. Shadow Man of Mega Man 3 and the Stardroids of Mega Man V are both featured as creations of Ra Moon, the primary antagonist from Super Adventure Rockman, and all are featured as foes of a group of robots based on Mega Man 8 character Duo. Mega Man and Proto Man's Japanese names-Rock and Blues-are adapted as the names for their civilian forms. Several Robot Masters also appear in the series earlier than they did in the games.

Boom! Studios released a six-issue miniseries based on Mega Man: Fully Charged in August 2020, which has made the return of the Archie comic even more unlikely.

Premise

As in the Mega Man games, the comic is set on the planet Earth in the year 20XX, a not-so-distant future period in which advanced robots capable of independent thought and decisions making have been developed. The evil scientist Dr. Wily sets out to conquer the world, doing so first by stealing or creating advanced automatons known as Robot Masters. In order to stop him, Rock -- a helper robot created by Wily's old colleague, Dr. Light -- volunteers to be equipped with weapons so that he can stand against him.

Issues #1–23

Issues #1-4 serve as an adaptation of the first Mega Man, while #5-8 are a loose adaptation of Mega Man Powered Up, mainly serving to incorporate the characters of Time Man and Oil Man. #9-12 adapt the events of Mega Man 2, while #13-#16 serve introduce the Emerald Spears, an anti-technology extremist group. #17-18 adapt the backstory for Proto Man discussed in various games, most notably Mega Man 2: The Power Fighters. The following issues provide build-up for the then-upcoming Super Adventure Rockman story arc before being interrupted by the events of Worlds Collide at the end of Issue #23.

Worlds Collide

Worlds Collide is a crossover between the universes of Mega Man and Archie's Sonic the Hedgehog comic series. The 12-part miniseries takes place across Mega Man issues #24-27, Sonic Universe issues #51-54, and Sonic the Hedgehog issues #248-251.

Issues #28–49

Following the conclusion of Worlds Collide, an adaptation of Super Adventure Rockman takes place during issues #28-32. Issues #33-36 address the fallout from these events and set the stage for the events of Mega Man 3, while also adapting the origin story of Mega Man X and the Reploids from the Mega Man X series. #37-40 feature an original storyline split between the two time periods, during which Mega Man and his team must defeat a rogue Wily robot while the Maverick Hunters encounter the same robot a century later. Issues #41-48 serve as an adaptation of Mega Man 3, while #49 acts as a prelude to the events of Worlds Unite.

Worlds Unite

Worlds Unite is the second crossover between the Mega Man and Sonic the Hedgehog comics. In addition to the casts of the main Mega Man and Sonic books, Worlds Unite also features characters from the Mega Man X and Sonic Boom universes, as well as several other Capcom and Sega franchises such as Street Fighter, Golden Axe, Viewtiful Joe, Panzer Dragoon, Ōkami, Nights into Dreams..., Monster Hunter, Ghosts 'n Goblins, and Skies of Arcadia. The 12-part miniseries takes place across Sonic Universe issues #76-78, Sonic Boom issues #8-10, Sonic the Hedgehog issues #273-275, Mega Man issues #50-52, and two Worlds Unite "Battle Books".

Issues #53–55

Returning to the usual storyline of the series, these issues lead up into an indefinite hiatus taken by the series. These include a story where Mega Man confronts the idea of no longer being a fighting robot due to Wily's disappearance, while Blues—Mega Man's older brother—transitions from his identity of Break Man to that of Proto Man. Both of these stories included buildup to the events of Mega Man 4 and set up for subsequent games, enabled by Wily's association with the X Corporation and his deception of Blues. The concluding issue features a time travel experiment mishap that results in Dr. Light viewing events depicted in the remaining Mega Man titles not yet adapted (4 through 10, including the handheld spin offs) plus Mega Man X, Mega Man Zero, Mega Man ZX, Mega Man ZX Advent, and Mega Man Legends timelines.

Characters/Concepts

Adapted from the games

Heroes
DLN-001: Rock Light/Mega Man - Dr. Light's assistant robot who volunteers for modification into a fighting robot after Dr. Wily steals the original set of Robot Masters. The comics often feature him struggling with fighting and destroying fellow robots due to his peaceful nature, and at times being overwhelmed by the power of wielding multiple Robot Master weapons. He also takes unnecessary burdens upon himself, often feeling that he hasn't done enough despite his accomplishments.
Dr. Thomas Light - Mega Man's creator who regards his creations-particularly Rock, Roll, and Blues-as his children. Here his old colleagues include not only Dr. Wily, but also Drs. Mikhail Cossack and Noele Lalinde.
DLN-002: Roll Light - Mega Man's robotic sister, who constantly worries over her brother's well-being. Roll also occasionally becomes irritated with Rock if he acts reckless or blames himself needlessly.
DLN-000: Blues Light/Break Man/Proto Man - Dr. Light's first Robot Master who was built with an energy core that proved unstable. After overhearing only part of a conversation between Drs. Light and Lalinde and mistakenly coming to believe that Light intended to change his programming, he leaves Dr. Light for a time. He later decided to return but changed his mind after seeing Rock and Roll and assuming that Light had built them to replace him, and was eventually found and repaired by Dr. Wily. This leads him to join Dr. Wily's forces under the identity of Break Man, though his moral code proved infuriating to Wily. He joined the alliance of heroes in Worlds Collide, which saw reality altered so that Mega Man's world was moved into the future and Blues became Proto Man. Following the crossover reality was returned to normal and Blues-once again known as Break Man-returned to Wily's service and retained this alias through the events of the Super Adventure Rockman and Mega Man 3 adaptations and even during the Worlds Unite crossover. Subsequently, he would reluctantly rejoin Wily after the doctor claimed that his new nuclear energy core would explode if not properly maintained, and thus assisted his plans by kidnapping Kalinka Cossack. However, after secretly meeting with Dr. Noele Lalinde and being examined by her, he learned that he was not a danger to anyone else, and promptly adopted the persona of Proto Man in order to oppose his former master.
Auto - A robotic mechanic built by Dr. Light on a lesser level of sophistication than the Robot Masters, he is Mega Man's biggest fan and one of his strongest supporters.
Support Units
Rush - A transforming robotic dog built by Dr. Light to serve as a support unit for Mega Man, primarily providing him transport through various environs.
Eddie - A robot designed to provide Mega Man with additional equipment during his missions.
Tango - A robotic cat that also aids Mega Man in his battles with evil.
Beat - A robotic bird built by Dr. Cossack.
Dr. Mikhail Sergeyevich and Kalinka Cossack - A brilliant Russian robotics scientist and his daughter who are friends to Dr. Light, Dr. Lalinde, and their robotic "children." Dr. Cossack aids Dr. Light in several expeditions, sending his own Robot Masters into action alongside Mega Man. Kalinka was later abducted by a blackmailed Blues in order to Wily to use her in a similar gambit against her father, who was forced to play the part of another would be world conqueror.
Duo - An intergalactic law enforcement robot who, in the comics, is a member of a group known as the Star Marshals. He has existed for many thousands of years, fighting against evils such as the Stardroids and his own traitorous comrade Trio. Duo joined the allied heroes in Worlds Collide, and helped to combat the monstrous Chaos Devil.
X - An advanced creation of Dr. Light's built some time after the events of the classic Mega Man series. The comics find him dealing with Archie-exclusive threats such as the Emerald Spears and Wily Walker, and later taking part in the Worlds Unite crossover event.
DWN-∞ Zero - A robot created by Dr. Wily after the events of the classic Mega Man series who takes part in the Worlds Unite crossover after helping face the Wily Walker in the "Dawn of X" storyline.
Dr. Cain - An archaeologist from 100 years into the future of Mega Man's world who discovers X and awakens him, copying his design as best as he can to create the Reploids. He also inadvertently uncovered the Wily Walker, which subsequently began a rampage that had to be halted by the Maverick Hunters.
Axl - Part of a new generation of Reploids created after X and Zero and who later joined the Maverick Hunters. He joins his teammates in battling Sigma's evil alliance in Worlds Unite.
Maverick Hunters - A group of Reploids-advanced robots based on X-whose mission is to protect the world from Sigma and other renegade robots known collectively as Mavericks. In the comics they fought against the Wily Walker before taking part in Worlds Unite.

Villains
Dr. Albert W. Wily - Mega Man's nemesis and the rival and former colleague of Dr. Thomas Light. In the comics Wily was banned from work in the field of robotics after arming his mobile weapons platform, the Wily Walker, with chemical weapons. His greatest weakness is his jealousy of Dr. Light, which he uses as an excuse to continue pursuing his evil path even after being forgiven and shown mercy by his enemies.
Copy Robot - An evil clone of Mega Man created by Dr. Wily to match Mega Man in every respect, but defeated by the original six Robot Masters upon their rebellion from Wily's control. Another version of him sporting a purple scarf later appeared in Worlds Collide and captured several of Sonic the Hedgehog's allies for transformation into the Roboticized Masters, but was later defeated while battling alongside the Genesis Unit. Still another model was created when Mega Man attempted to stop Dr. Wily's fourth bid at world domination, and was convinced by Mega Man that he might follow a peaceful path but was destroyed.
Ra Moon - An ancient alien supercomputer originating from the game Super Adventure Rockman, which was adapted in the comic series before Mega Man 3. It is responsible for reviving the Mega Man 2 Robot Masters after they are destroyed by Mega Man, and later for creating the Mega Man 3 Robot Masters from designs created by Dr. Light, which Dr. Wily claimed to have a hand in. Ra Moon is also revealed to be connected to other alien machines from the Mega Man games, including Shadow Man and the Stardroids. Other than these changes and a brief role in Worlds Collide, Ra Moon's role in the comics was largely identical to its role in Super Adventure Rockman.
Reggae - A robotic Oriental stork created by Dr. Wily as a companion. It joined Blues on his mission to abduct Kalinka Cossack for Dr. Wily.
SWN-001: Bass - An advanced robot created by Dr. Wily, and the first and only member of the Special Wily Number series. Mega Man encountered him twice in the series prior to an adaptation of Mega Man 7, his debut game, the first being during a time travel adventure in "Rock of Ages." He later appeared in Worlds Collide due to alterations to reality, and teamed up with Metal Sonic to capture various allies of Sonic and Mega Man's before engaging the pair in battle.
Treble - Bass's faithful robotic wolf who fights alongside him and Metal Sonic in Worlds Collide.
Stardroids - Ra Moon's robotic "children" who seek to fulfill its agenda and later travel towards Earth to avenge their creator's demise. They are identified by the series SRN, short for Space Ruler Number-and a numerical designation.
SRN-001: Terra - The leader of the Stardroids who commissioned the Kuiper Droids to escort Ra Moon to safety on Earth while he led a counterattack against the Star Marshals seeking to destroy Ra Moon.
SRN-002: Mercury
SRN-003: Venus
SRN-004: Mars
SRN-005: Jupiter
SRN-006: Saturn
SRN-007: Uranus
SRN-008: Pluto
SRN-009: Neptune
Sunstar - Makes a brief cameo after Ra Moon is defeated, after the future Wily Star is seen moving towards Earth.
X Foundation - A group led by the mysterious Mr. X that recovers Dr. Wily from the ruins of his castle at the end of the Mega Man 3 adaptation. Their membership includes a blue-clad, red-haired woman originally designed by Mega Man artist Hideki Ishikawa, but slightly modified and dubbed Madam Y. Unlike their mysterious counterparts from Mega Man 6, the comics version of the foundation is dedicated to bringing an end to advanced robotics through any means necessary, not unlike the comics-exclusive Emerald Spears organization. To this end, Mr. X provides Wily with new resources so that he can create Robot Masters to terrorize the world, and is later revealed to be a future version of comics-exclusive villain Xander Payne.
Quint - Green robot resembling Mega Man whom he encountered during his time travel adventure in "Rock of Ages."
Rockman Shadow - A robot originally coming from Rockman & Forte Mirai kara no Chōsensha as the main antagonist. He appears briefly during Mega Man's time traveling in "Rock of Ages", and though easily mistaken from Quint, he can be told apart due to having an arm cannon and stating he will no longer "live in Mega Man's shadow".
King - Leader of a Robot Master rebellion encountered by a time-traveling Mega Man in "Rock of Ages."
Devil Robots - A line of amorphous robots that are usually vulnerable to attacks launched at their single eyes. The Yellow Devil and Yellow Devil Mk. II appear in a capacity virtually identical to their game roles, but serve as inspiration for the Worlds Collide enemy known as the Chaos Devil. This being is created by combining Devil technology with the water elemental Chaos from the world of Sonic the Hedgehog, and proved a formidable foe until it was defeated by Duo. Ra Moon later created its own Devil robot, the Ra Devil, but made the mistake of powering it directly and thus leaving itself vulnerable to an attack by Mega Man.
Sigma - A highly advanced Reploid and former Maverick Hunter who later took control of the Mavericks after becoming one himself. Prior to his defection in the comics, Sigma joined X and other Maverick Hunters in battling the Wily Walker. He would later become the primary antagonist of Worlds Unite, setting out to merge worlds from various realities so that he could drain their power with help from an army of revived Mavericks, Mechaniloid robots, and the Deadly Six of Sonic Lost World. His efforts would involve traveling to Dr. Eggman's world as a computer virus and winning the loyalty of the Deadly Six, and forcing Eggman to build him a new body before teaming him up with Dr. Wily yet again. He later took on a massive new form before taking on a final body to battle Super Sonic and Super Mega Man.
Vile - One of Sigma's fellow Mavericks, an ex-Maverick Hunter turned Maverick who was distrusted by X and Zero even before he went Maverick. He participated in the battle with the Wily Walker, displaying little regard for human civilians caught in the crossfire, before appearing in Sigma's army in Worlds Unite.
Mavericks - Reploids and Mechaniloids who have turned against humanity due to infection by a virus or of their own volition. Led by Sigma, these villains seek to eradicate humanity, with a large number of them being revived and formed into an army during Worlds Unite.

Robot Masters
Light Numbers - Dr. Light's robotic creations, built after his trio of "children" and bearing the series designation Doctor Light Number. Following their initial battles with Mega Man under Wily's control, the original line often works in a support role to Mega Man, while their successors-originating from Mega Man 9-assist in other ways. The original line fought against Wily's forces in Worlds Collide and later Sigma's forces in Worlds Unite; the secondary line served as villains in the first crossover.
DLN-003: Cut Man - A wisecracking robot who loves bad puns, usually playing off his bladed weaponry.
DLN-004: Guts Man - A super-strong robot built for construction who admires strength above all else. Dr. Wily created a giant robot known as the Guts Tank in his image, which enraged Guts Man so much that he led the attack on it while Mega Man moved on to confront Wily.
DLN-005: Ice Man - Equipped with ice creating abilities, Ice Man also harbors a crush on Roll, who appears entirely unaware of his affections.
DLN-006: Bomb Man - Capable of generating explosives and obsessed with using them in a dramatic style, though his abilities do have their limits.
DLN-007: Fire Man - Pyrotechnic Robot Master who speaks with a southern accent and who is firmly dedicated to the concept of justice.
DLN-008: Elec Man - An electrically powered robot who proudly fights alongside Mega Man but struggles with his inability to fight humans who aren't bringing direct harm to others, no matter how evil they may be. Elec Man was responsible for the injuries that led Xander Payne to begin his crusade against advanced robotics.
DLN-00A: Time Man - One of two Robot Masters who originated in Mega Man: Powered Up rather than the original Mega Man game, but who bring the original set of six up to a group of eight. Time Man is a stickler for scheduling and order, and this differentiates him from his more laid back "brother" Oil Man. After being recovered from Dr. Wily's clutches, Time Man takes up residence at the Chronos Institute, where phenomena related to time are studied.
DLN-00B: Oil Man - An oil-producing Robot Master whose face is always partially covered by a red bandanna. He and Time Man are an experimental lineup-hence their A and B designations-initially deemed too powerful for completion by Dr. Light, which prompted Dr. Wily to steal them and complete them himself.
DLN-065: Concrete Man - One of the Mega Man 9 Robot Masters, a robot who mixes concrete for construction. He is friends with fellow construction robot Guts Man, the two forming a bond despite some initial clashing.
DLN-066: Tornado Man - Appeared in Worlds Collide.
DLN-067: Splash Woman - The second female Robot Master built by Dr. Light-after Roll-and one forced to remain in water due to her mermaid-inspired design. Splash Woman, like Concrete Man, was introduced into the comics early so that her eventual turn to villainy during the Mega Man 9 storyline would have more meaning to it. She assisted Roll and Quake Woman in saving a damaged cruise ship, and was later seen working alongside Bubble Man, Oil Man, and Pump Man to investigate oil dumping in the Mega City sewer system.
DLN-068: Plug Man
DLN-069: Jewel Man
DLN-070: Hornet Man
DLN-071: Magma Man
DLN-072: Galaxy Man 
Wily Numbers - Robot Masters created by Dr. Wily, whether through seeking to improve upon Dr. Light's designs, utilizing plans that he and Light "collaborated" on, or based on his own ideas. They are each identified by a Doctor Wily Number designation, which is also applied to Robot Masters stolen by Dr. Wily from other scientists and reprogrammed to serve him. Curiously, their numbering begins after Dr. Light's original series.
DWN-009: Metal Man - A saw-blade throwing Robot Master intended to be an improvement upon Cut Man. He and his brothers of the second line of Robot Masters were all purposely created to be destroyed by Mega Man, with the intent being to infect him with a virus whenever he copied one of their weapons; this virus would ultimately turn Mega Man into Wily's obedient puppet until he was cured.
DWN-010: Air Man - Wind-generating Robot Master with a fairly arrogant and self-assured personality. After being destroyed, Air Man and the rest of his brothers were recreated by Ra Moon using information on Dr. Wily's laptop. He later took up a position monitoring Mega City's weather with some help from Ice Man.
DWN-011: Bubble Man - Aquatic Robot Master whose greatest weakness is his limited mobility on land, something about which he is rather sensitive. Despite this, he can display quite the temper, but is given to posturing. He was among the Wily Numbers who chose to be repurposed by Dr. Light, and wound up working alongside Splash Woman, Pump Man, and Oil Man.
DWN-012: Quick Man - Super speedy Robot Master who quickly established himself as a rival to Mega Man determined to destroy his foe. He bested Mega Man easily in their early encounters, but his arrogance led to his defeat after Mega Man acquired Flash Man's time freezing ability. Despite his hatred for Mega Man, he quickly allied himself and his brothers with the blue hero after learning that Ra Moon had tricked Dr. Wily and had its own agenda of world domination. Following Wily's apparent demise, Quick Man and several of his brothers chose to be deactivated rather than reprogrammed, and were placed in storage in a Robot Museum.
DWN-013: Crash Man - A bomb-equipped Robot Master created by combining Guts Man and Bomb Man's designs. Crash Man is a powerful foe, but suffers from one flaw: his arms end in launchers for his bombs, and he has no hands to speak of. Like his brothers from Mega Man 2 he was destroyed by Mega Man and recreated by Ra Moon, and later chose to be shut down and placed in a museum.
DWN-014: Flash Man - Equipped with the ability to freeze time rather than slow it down like Time Man, Flash Man is as arrogant as they come. However, he came to despise Quick Man after his brother took him down so he could fight Mega Man himself, and suffers from one other weakness: he's obsessed with the fact that Dr. Wily designed him with no hair. After being recreated by Ra Moon and employed in another scheme of Wily's, Flash Man chose to start working at the Chronos Institute with Time Man, where they managed to make progress in the field of time travel research despite their bickering.
DWN-015: Heat Man - A fire-producing Robot Master intended as an improvement on Fire Man, but who is vulnerable to his own abilities and must employ a regulator installed on his back. Along with the other Mega Man 2 Robot Masters, Heat Man later had his personality chip and weapon data fitted into the Doc Robot with the intent of combining all their powers to destroy Mega Man. However, the presence-and clash-of so many personalities in one body led to the robot's downfall; Heat Man was subsequently restored by Dr. Light but chose to be shut down permanently.
DWN-016: Wood Man - A unique Robot Master constructed almost entirely out of a rare wood, who was convinced that he had no other purpose than to serve as Dr. Wily's weapon. However, Mega Man later recovered his personality chip and body following the defeat of the Doc Robot, and Dr. Light rebuilt him and his brothers with the hopes of putting them to use benefiting society. Wood Man accepted the chance and became involved in forestry, with Cut Man assisting him in cutting down trees too diseased to recover.
DWN-017: Needle Man - Like Crash Man before him, Needle Man suffers from a lack of hands in his design, but makes up for it in his ability to knit. While he feels obligated to serve Dr. Wily, he has nothing but contempt for his creator, and he later chose to be deactivated rather than given a new function to serve after Wily's supposed demise.
DWN-018: Magnet Man - A magnetic Robot Master who, like his brothers, was created new by Ra Moon using designs taken from Dr. Wilys laptop. As a result, he and the other Mega Man 3 Robot Masters were initially susceptible to complete domination by Ra Moon, which ended after the alien supercomputer was destroyed. He and his brothers fought Mega Man and were defeated as part of a ploy by Wily to seize Gamma, and Magnet Man was later one of eight Wily Numbers who asked to be shut down permanently.
DWN-019: Gemini Man - Hologram-projecting Robot Master who creates-and converses with-holographic clones of himself that seem to possess their own personalities, going so far as resisting Ra Moon's control. He and his brothers were employed in secret by Wily, who was putting on a front of having reformed, to steal the eight Energy Elements powering Dr. Light's latest creation, the massive disaster response robot Gamma. Following this plan's failure, Gemini Man chose to be deactivated, feeling his technology had no real application in peaceful society.
DWN-020: Hard Man - A powerful Robot Master who joined four of his brothers in hiding with their stolen Energy Elements at various locations on Earth's surface. Unlike many of his brothers, Hard Man relished the prospect of an honorable battle with Mega Man, wishing to test his might against Mega Man's abilities. He was also one of the few Wily Numbers who looked forward to receiving a new purpose from Dr. Light, joining Bomb Man and Snake Man in surveying and landscaping functions.
DWN-021: Top Man - A Robot Master who takes meticulous detail in setting up his defenses, and who is initially furious when Mega Man blasts or flies his way through the gauntlet set for him. Top Man and four of his brothers set up their lairs on orbiting space stations; upon defeat, he admitted that Mega Man had a certain artistic quality of his own, if a simplistic one. He would later be shut down at his own request by Dr. Light after being restored,.
DWN-022: Snake Man - This Robot Master delights in terrifying his opponents-or his allies-with his robotic snakes, but found Mega Man a braver opponent than anticipated. After defeating him, Mega Man recovered his personality chip, doing the same with the other Mega Man 3 Robot Masters in hopes of them being rebuilt to serve peaceful purposes. He soon found himself doing landscaping work with Hard Man and Bomb Man, though he managed to retain his creepy attitude.
DWN-023: Spark Man - The last of the Mega Man 3 Robot Masters faced by Mega Man, Spark Man formed close ties with his brothers and was heartbroken by their defeats. Like Crash Man and Needle Man he lacks hands, and it was from him that Mega Man learned of Dr. Wily's treachery. After being rebuilt he embraced the opportunity to serve a new function, and ended up working in a power plant with Elec Man.
DWN-024: Shadow Man - An alien Robot Master who in the comics is revealed to have been a Kuiper Droid, one of the bodyguards of Ra Moon who accompanied his master to Earth eons ago. Falling offline over the course of time, he was later found by Dr. Wily in Ra Moon's temple and revived as a ninja-themed Robot Master. Shadow Man was originally loyal only to Ra Moon, and upon his master's destruction at the hands of Mega Man swore revenge upon him and allegiance to Dr. Wily. However, he was defeated along with the other Mega Man 3 Robot Masters, and Wily's plan to conquer the world with the stolen Gamma was thwarted when Mega Man defeated the giant automaton. Shadow Man was later rebuilt by Dr. Light and agreed to be reprogrammed and repurposed, but only did so to put himself in a position to betray Dr. Light later. He soon joined in Dr. Wily's operations involving the X Corporation and Dr. Cossack, contacting Break Man and overseeing the development of Wily's operations while maintaining his front as a "reformed" robot.
DWN-033: Gravity Man
DWN-034: Wave Man
DWN-035: Stone Man
DWN-036: Gyro Man
DWN-037: Star Man
DWN-038: Charge Man
DWN-039: Napalm Man
DWN-040: Crystal Man
DWN-049: Freeze Man
DWN-050: Junk Man
DWN-051: Burst Man
DWN-052: Cloud Man
DWN-053: Spring Man
DWN-054: Slash Man
DWN-055: Shade Man
DWN-056: Turbo Man
DWN-057: Tengu Man
DWN-058: Astro Man
DWN-059: Sword Man
DWN-060: Clown Man
DWN-061: Search Man
DWN-062: Frost Man
DWN-063: Grenade Man
DWN-064: Aqua Man
NWN-001: Ra Thor - The first and only member of the New Wily Number series, Ra Thor was built by Dr. Wily by copying Ra Moon's technology with the intent of destroying the supercomputer after it betrayed him. However, Ra Thor's kinship with Ra Moon made it susceptible to the alien computer's control, which forced Mega Man, Break Man, and their allies to bring it down.
Cossack Numbers - Dr. Cossack's set of eight Robot Masters, built by him for peaceful purposes and reluctantly equipped with weapons. In Worlds Collide they appeared as part of Dr. Wily and Dr. Eggman's army of Robot Masters, fighting against the allied heroes under Sonic and Mega Man. Upon being corrupted by Wily, they are designated under the DWN series, and attack the world apparently under the instructions of Dr. Cossack.
DWN-025: Bright Man - A light-producing, time freezing Robot Master who joined Pharaoh Man and Mega Man in searching for Dr. Wily's "rogue" Robot Masters. Their search led them to an old laboratory of Wily's where they were forced to battle the Wily Walker, which Bright Man used his new weapon to freeze. The trio then buried it and left an information capsule with the walker due to their inability to safely destroy it.
DWN-026: Toad Man
DWN-027: Drill Man - Digging Robot Master conceived of by Dr. Cossack after seeing the effectiveness of robots such as Quake Woman in investigating hazardous environments.
DWN-028: Pharaoh Man - Egyptian-themed Robot Master designed to explore ancient tombs and as a companion and protector for Dr. Cossack's daughter Kalinka. While brave in the face of danger, he gets somewhat nervous in the company of pretty girls and women.
DWN-029: Ring Man
DWN-030: Dust Man
DWN-031: Dive Man
DWN-032: Skull Man
King Numbers - A group of Robot Masters who serve Wily's creation King, and are known by the designation KinG Number. Like most of the other Robot Masters, they served in Wily and Eggman's army during Worlds Collide.
KGN-001: Dynamo Man
KGN-002: Cold Man
KGN-003: Ground Man
KGN-004: Pirate Man
KGN-005: Burner Man
KGN-006: Magic Man
Genesis Unit - A trio of Robot Master identified by the Wily Wars Numbers series designation and based on characters from the epic Journey to the West. They appeared in "Rock of Ages", an anniversary story alongside the Mega Man Killers, hinting at a future role in the series. They appeared in Worlds Collide both as part of the Robot Master army and accompanying Copy Robot in attacking Mega Man and Sonic's team.
WWN-01: Buster Rod G - A monkey-themed Robot Master based on Sun Wukong who battled Sonic the Hedgehog in Worlds Collide.
WWN-02: Mega Water S - Water-controlling Robot Master based on Sha Wujing who battled Proto Man in Worlds Collide.
WWN-03: Hyper Storm H - Pig-themed Robot Master based on Zhu Bajie who battled Miles "Tails" Prower in Worlds Collide.
Mega Man Killers - Three Robot Masters created for the express purpose of destroying Mega Man. Identified as the Mega Man Killer Number series, they first appear in the anniversary story "Rock of Ages." They later appear in Worlds Collide as part of the Wily Egg battle station's defenses, battling Sonic and Mega Man and injuring Tails prior to being defeated.
MKN-001: Enker
MKN-002: Punk
MKN-003: Ballade - Appeared in Worlds Collide, where his sacrifice in the games was alluded to by Mega Man but ignored by Ballade, as he was a clone of Ballade from before that point in time.
Other Numbers - Various Robot Masters designed by other scientists who went unidentified in the games. 
DWN-041: Blizzard Man
DWN-042: Centaur Man
DWN-043: Flame Man
DWN-044: Knight Man
DAN-001/DWN-045: Plant Man - The first known Robot Master created by comics-exclusive character Dr. Pedro Astil-hence the Designation Doctor Astil Number-001-he is introduced during the Super Adventure Rockman adapt rather than during the events of Mega Man 6. Following Ra Moon's defeat he joined an expedition to the ruins that had contained the villainous supercomputer to confirm Ra Moon's demise and Wily's claim that the alien villain had used him.
DWN-046: Tomahawk Man
DWN-047: Wind Man
DWN-048: Yamato Man
DWN-073: Blade Man
DWN-074: Pump Man - A Robot Master who participated in rescue efforts incident to Ra Moon's electromagnetic field causing a planetwide blackout, and later worked with Splash Woman, Bubble Man, and Oil Man to investigate illegal oil dumping.
DWN-075: Commando Man
DWN-076: Chill Man
DWN-077: Sheep Man
DWN-078: Strike Man
DWN-079: Nitro Man
DWN-080: Solar Man

Archie exclusives

Heroes/Allies
Gilbert D. Stern and Roslyn "Rosie" Krantz — A detective duo who become involved in the effort to bring Dr. Wily to justice after his initial takeover attempt. Stern is a middle-aged man with little taste for modern technology, while Krantz is a younger woman who appears more open to the idea of sentient machines. Despite their clear differences, the two make an effective team, and have enough regard for Mega Man that they refrained from arresting Dr. Wily while he helped with Mega Man's repairs following the defeat of Ra Moon. The pair are named for the characters Guildenstern and Rosencrantz from William Shakespeare's Hamlet.
Dr. Noele Lalinde — A Robot Master developer and old colleague of Drs. Cossack and Light, who also serves as Dr. Light's love interest. Like Dr. Light, Noele Lalinde regarded her first Robot Master as a child, but briefly deemed this a mistake after going through the emotional trauma of nearly losing her in an accident. However, she eventually determined that she had been in error, and endeavored to restore her relationship with her "daughter."
Lalinde Model Numbers
LMN-001: Tempo/Quake Woman — A female Robot Master created by Dr. Lalinde and equipped with digging powers. She had her emotions removed by Dr. Lalinde after an accident, as Dr. Lalinde hoped it would help her grow detached, resulting in her being very shy and timid around others. However, upon realizing that she still cared for her "daughter," and that her lack of emotions prevented her from spending time with her friends, Lalinde restored Quake Woman's emotions. An attempt to set her and Mega Man up as a couple was made by Roll, but the two voted to remain only friends at the time. She was later approached by Blues, operating under the alias Break Man, and she informed him that she had chosen for forgive Dr. Lalinde for taking away her emotions, and then questioned why he could not forgive Dr. Light for something his creator had not even done.
LMN-002: Vesper Woman- Dr. Lalinde's second Robot Master, created from an unused design created by Dr. Light (in reality a concept design for the Robot Master Hornet Man). Designed for botanical cataloging, she served the additional purpose of helping Quake Woman explore her renewed emotional capacity. Her relationship with Quake Woman is a teasing one, as evidenced by her implying that Blues was Quake Woman's "boyfriend" upon their first encounter.
Dr. Pedro Astil — Another old colleague of Dr. Light's and the creator of Plant Man from Mega Man 6. An amputee missing his right arm, Dr. Astil is depicted having been part of a team that investigated the ancient ruins that contained the alien computer Ra Moon. Dr. Astil lost his arm as a result of this ill-fated expedition, and later joined in the relief efforts when Ra Moon's electromagnetic field spread over the planet. He also joined an expedition led by Mega Man into Ra Moon's temple in order to verify Dr. Wily's claims and make certain that Ra Moon was permanently offline.
Star Marshals — A group based on Duo from Mega Man 8 who fought against Ra Moon's forces. In addition to Duo, its members included a robot named Quartet who nearly destroyed Ra Moon. However, Quartet was destroyed by former comrade Trio (Duo's unnamed opponent from the prologue of Mega Man 8), who sides with the Stardroids against his colleagues.
Samantha — A female Reploid introduced in the first Mega Man X based story in the comics, and a member of Dr. Cain's archaeological team.

Villains
Emerald Spears — An anti-robot terrorist group initially led by Harvey Greenleaf but then taken over by the more radical Xander Payne, whose group hatred for robotics is derived from losing an eye to the attack made by Elec Man while the Robot Master was under Dr. Wily's control. The debuted attacking a robotics expo attended by Mega Man and his family, rigging the event with explosives and hoping to win support to their cause. However, most of the group was arrested and while some bombs went off, Mega Man and his fellow Robot Masters were able to minimize the damage. Xander, his younger brother Theo Payne, and Theo's girlfriend Simone Miller, who apparently has some history with Roslyn Krantz, managed to escape and staged a suicide attack at a New Year's celebration only to be captured. Xander eventually escaped and went on a brief journey into the future, where he witnessed the future depicted in Mega Man X and learned that the Emerald Spears continued to exist in that time. His experience caused him to start etching images from his travels into the walls of his cell. He would later appear in the Worlds Unite crossover, forming an unlikely alliance with Drs. Wily and Eggman, and ended up undoing the events of the crossover by preventing Sigma's trip back through time. It was subsequently revealed that he will eventually become the Mega Man 6 villain Mr. X, who in the game was a disguised Dr. Wily. The group is named in reference to Ruby-Spears, the production company that created the 1994 Mega Man animated series.
Kuiper Droids — A group of robots loyal to Ra Moon and his Stardroids, with one member eventually becoming Shadow Man. Several of them were tasked with escorting Ra Moon to safety when the Star Marshals attacked, but an attack by Marshal Quartet destroyed all but one of them-the future Shadow Man.
Wily Walker — A giant robot built by Dr. Wily for the government; he was subsequently forbidden from experimenting with robotics for equipping it with chemical weapons. Years later, a supposedly reformed Wily directed Mega Man and two of Dr. Cossack's Robot Master here in search of eight "renegade" Robot Masters (the bosses from Mega Man 3) and tricked them into activating the Walker in the hopes that it would destroy them. They managed to subdue it but were forced to leave it buried in the ruins of Wily's lab with an information capsule in case it was ever activated again. It would later rise again in the Mega Man X time period, going on a rampage before being stopped by X and the Maverick Hunters. The Wily Walker's design drew heavily from the Wily Machine featured in Mega Man 3.

Development

Reception
The Archie Mega Man comics have been well received by critics and consumers.

References

2011 comics debuts
2015 comics endings
Action-adventure comics
Archie Comics titles
Comics based on video games
Mega Man
Robot comics
Superhero comics
Works based on Capcom video games